David Ball is a British Shooting sport residing in Banks, Lancashire.

Target Shooting
He competes in Down-The-Line competitions throughout the UK, having previously competed at the highest level. Over time, he has expanded his shooting ability to focus on training people who want to get into the sport of clay pigeon shooting. He is used by a large proportion of the United Kingdom's top trap shooters. Dave has worked with the son of sports shooter David Waddington, Andy Waddington. After the training, Andy became the top junior DTL shooter in England in 2004.

David is sponsored by Express Cartridges. The manufacturers of this product have David on the cover of their cartridge boxes for promotion, as he is a notable shooter, mainly in the North West, along with other parts of England.

References

Year of birth missing (living people)
Living people
English male sport shooters
People from Tarleton
British male sport shooters